Brancker is a surname. Notable people with the surname include:

Rawle Brancker (1937–2021), West Indian cricketer
Mary Brancker (1914–2010), English veterinary surgeon
Sefton Brancker (1877–1930), Royal Air Force air marshal and British Army general

See also
Branker